Alistair is a masculine given name. It is an Anglicised form of the Scottish Gaelic Alasdair. The latter is most likely a Scottish Gaelic variant of the Norman French Alexandre or Latin Alexander, which was incorporated into English in the same form as Alexander. The deepest etymology is the Greek Ἀλέξανδρος (man-repeller): ἀλέξω (repel) + ἀνήρ (man), "the one who repels men", a warrior name. Another, not nearly so common, Anglicization of Alasdair is Allaster.

People

Alastair
 Alastair, 2nd Duke of Connaught and Strathearn (1914–1943), a great-grandson of Queen Victoria
 Alastair Bray, Australian footballer
 Alastair Aiken, British YouTuber
 Alastair Campbell, Tony Blair's former director of communications
 Alastair Clarkson, head coach of Hawthorn Football Club
 Alastair Cook, English cricketer
 Alastair Fothergill, British film producer, best known for BBC nature documentaries
 Alastair Gillespie, former Canadian politician who held several cabinet positions in the 1970s
 Alastair Mackenzie, Scottish actor most famous for playing Archie MacDonald in Monarch of the Glen
 Alastair Reynolds, Welsh science fiction author
 Alastair Robinson, Anglo-American field botanist
 Alastair Sim (1900–1976), comedy actor
 Alastair Sooke (born 1981), English art critic and broadcaster
 Al Stewart, Scottish singer-songwriter
 Alastair Stewart, ITV News presenter

Alistair
 Alistair Abell, Canadian voice actor
 Alistair Appleton, television presenter
 Alistair Begg, American pastor, author, and speaker
Alistair Brownlee, British triathlete and Olympic gold medalist
 Alistair Campbell, Zimbabwean cricketer
 Alistair Carmichael, British politician
 Alistair Cooke (1908–2004), journalist and broadcaster
 Alistair Darling, British politician
 Alistair Hargreaves, South African rugby player
 Alistair Hinton, Scottish composer
 Alistair MacLean (1922–1987), Scottish novelist
 Alistair MacLeod (1936–2014), Canadian novelist, short story writer and academic
 Alistair McGowan, English impressionist and comedian
 Alistair McGregor, Scottish field hockey goalkeeper
 Alistair Overeem, Dutch MMA fighter
 Alistair Sinclair, computer scientist
 Alistair Taylor (1935–2004), personal assistant to the Beatles' manager Brian Epstein
 Ally MacLeod (1931–2004) Scottish footballer and national team manager
 Ally McCoist, Scottish footballer

Allister
 Allister Coetzee (born 1963), South African rugby union coach and former player
 Allister de Winter (born 1968), Australian retired cricketer
 Allister Grosart (1906–1984), Canadian politician
 Allister Heath (born 1978), British business journalist and commentator
 Allister Hogg (born 1983), Scottish rugby union footballer
 Allister Miller (1892–1951), South African aviation pioneer, First World War pilot, politician and entrepreneur
 Allister Surette (born 1961), Canadian politician
 Allister Carter (born 1979), English snooker player
 Allister Sparks (1933–2016), South African writer

Alister
 Alister Jack (born 1963), Scottish politician
 Alister MacKenzie (1870–1934), British golf course designer
 Alister McGrath (born 1953), Northern Irish theologian, priest, intellectual historian, scientist and Christian apologist

Aleister
 Aleister Black, Dutch professional wrestler
 Aleister Crowley (1875–1947), British occultist

Pseudonym
 Alastair (artist), pseudonym of Hans Henning Otto Harry Baron von Voigt, a German artist

In fiction
 Alastair, a demon on the television series Supernatural 
 Alastair Caine, a demon on the television series Charmed
 Alistair Cheng, a character in the Crazy Rich Asians novel as well as the film adaptation
 Alistair Theirin, a character from the Dragon Age video game series
 Sir Alistair Hammerlock, a character from the Borderlands video game series
 Alistair Leslie Graham, better known as Ali G, one of three fictional characters created and portrayed by Sacha Baron Cohen
 Brigadier Sir Alistair Gordon Lethbridge-Stewart, Brigadier of UNIT on British science fiction show Doctor Who
 Alastor "Mad-Eye" Moody, a character in the Harry Potter series by J. K. Rowling
 Alistair Smythe, a Spider-Man villain
 Alistair Crane, a villainous patriarch and businessman on TV's Passions
 Alistair Oh, the Uncle from the 39 Clues series
 Alistair Ryle, a character in the play Posh and film The Riot Club
 Alistair Krei, a Big Hero 6 character
 Alastair, family name of characters in three Georgette Heyer romance novels, These Old Shades, Devil's Cub and An Infamous Army
 Alistair, a character from the Twilight book and film series
 General Alister Azimuth, a character from Ratchet & Clank
 Allister, the ghost type gym leader of Stow-on-Side in Pokémon Shield
 Aleister, a mage-type character in Arena of Valor
 Aleister, Sterling Archer's butler in Season 11 of FXX's Archer
 Ser Alliser Thorne, master-of-arms in the Night's Watch in the A Song of Ice and Fire book series and Game of Thrones television series
 Alistar, a minotaur in the League of Legends game
 Alistair, a character in the film Wonder Woman 1984

See also
 Alastar
 Alastor
 Allaster
 Allister

 Macalester
 Macalister
 McAlister
 McAllester
 McAllister (surname)

Citations

References

English-language masculine given names
Masculine given names
Scottish masculine given names
Irish masculine given names
Welsh masculine given names
English masculine given names